Der Zibet is a Japanese visual kei rock band formed in 1984, which made its debut in 1985. They went on an indefinite hiatus in 1996, but resumed activities in 2007.

History 
Der Zibet was formed in 1984 by vocalist Issay and bassist Hal, who were previously in a band called Issay and Suicides. They were joined by guitarist Hikaru, drummer Mayumi and Mahito on keyboards. Only a year later, Mahito left the group just before they signed to a major record label (though he would continue to perform with them as a support member) and they released their debut album Violetter Ball.

Their fourth album Garden was recorded in London in 1988, with the process was videotaped and released on VHS. Der Zibet continued to put out many releases and collaborate with other artists, but after their 1996 live compilation album Ari the band went on hiatus.

In 2007 Der Zibet resumed activities, with Mahito a full member again. They released their thirteenth studio album Primitive on March 6, 2009. On November 10, 2010, they released the album Kaikoteki Mirai ~ Nostalgic Future, which is composed of new songs as well as self cover, live and remix versions of songs from throughout their 25-year career. They held the two man Rock'n Roll Vaudeville 2011 show together with Ra:IN on June 24, 2011.

In April 2012 Der Zibet released two more studio albums, Romanoid 1 and Romanoid 2. In September, they performed alongside Ra:IN, Ladies Room and Tokyo Yankees at the Yokohama Summer Rock Fes. – Revolution Rocks 2012.

They provided a cover of "Ai no Sōretsu" for the January 29, 2020 Buck-Tick tribute album Parade III ~Respective Tracks of Buck-Tick~

Members 
 Issay, born  – vocals
 Hikaru, born  – guitar
 Hal, born  – bass
 Mayumi, born  – drums
 Mahito, born  – keyboard (1984, 2007–present)

Discography 
Studio albums
 Violetter Ball -Purple Ball- (Violetter Ball-紫色の舞踏会-, October 21, 1985)
 Electric Moon and More (February 25, 1987)
 Der Zibet (March 21, 1988)
 Garden (November 21, 1988), Oricon Albums Chart Peak Position: #32
 Carnival (December 10, 1989)
 Homo Demens (October 1, 1990)
 Shishunki I -Upper Side- (思春期I-Upper Side-, July 7, 1991
 Shishunki II -Downer Side- (思春期II-Downer Side-, October 21, 1991) #64
 Trash Land (March 24, 1993) #100
 Pop Mania (January 21, 1994) #100
 Green (April 21, 1995) #100
 Kirigirisu (キリギリス, March 24, 1996)
 Primitive (March 6, 2009)
 Romanoid 1 (April 26, 2012)
 Romanoid 2 (August 15, 2012)
 Nine Stories (ナイン・ストーリーズ) (December 25, 2013)

Singles
 "Matsu Uta" (待つ歌, October 1, 1985)
 "Girls -Radical Dance Mix!-" (May 21, 1986)
 "Baby, I Want You" (February 25, 1987)
 "Only "You", Only "Love"" (March 21, 1988)
 "Blue Blue" (November 21, 1988)
 "Funny Panic" (September 21, 1989)
 "Mammoth no Yoru" (マンモスの夜, December 10, 1989)
 "Akari wo Keshi te" (灯りを消して, October 1, 1990)
 "Natsu no Nichi no Typhoon no Youni" (夏の日のタイフーンのように, January 21, 1993)
 "Nire no ki no ue" (楡の木の上, March 23, 1994)
 "Red Bitez (reD biteZ)" July 13, 2008)

Live albums
 Official? -Live Anthology- (August 21, 1993)

Compilation albums
 Selected '90-'91 Best (May 1, 1992)
 Historic Flowers (March 24, 1993)
 Ari (アリ, March 24, 1996)
 Kaikoteki Mirai ~ Nostalgic Future (懐古的未来～NOSTALGIC FUTURE, November 10, 2010) #300

Videos
 Der Zibet in Concert Yo-Yo-Yo Der Zibet in Garden Live Mania Live at Marz Genshi Chikara Tsua (原始力ツアー)
 Primitive Tour 2009 ~Winter~ Acoustic Mania''

References

External links 
  
 
 DER ZIBET discography

Visual kei musical groups
Japanese rock music groups
Musical groups established in 1985
Musical groups established in 1996
Musical groups reestablished in 2007
Musical quintets
1985 establishments in Japan